The How Now Stakes, Melbourne Racing Club Group 3 Thoroughbred horse race held under set weights with penalties conditions, for mares aged four years old and upwards, over a distance of 1200 metres in late September. It is held at Caulfield Racecourse in Melbourne, Australia.

History
The registered race is named after the brilliant filly How Now, who won the 1976 Underwood Stakes.  This race is held on the same card as the Underwood Stakes.

Distance
From 1999 onwards held over 1200m

Grade
 1999–2004 - Listed Race
 2005 onwards - Group 3.

Name
 1999 - Cranbourne Daihatsu Stakes
 2000–2001  - Dairy Farmers Milk Stakes
 2002 - Dubai Convention Bureau Stakes
 2003–2004  -  Emirates Racing Association Stakes
 2005 - Dubai International Stakes
 2006 - How Now Stakes
 2007 - South Yarra Stakes
 2008–2011 - How Now Stakes
 2012–2014 - Sportingbet Sprint Series Heat 2 Stakes
 2015 - William Hill Sprint Series Heat 2 Stakes
 2016 - Ladbrokes Odds Boost Stakes

Winners

 2022 - Zapateo
 2021 - Bella Nipotina
 2020 - Felicia
 2019 - Manicure
 2018 - Winter Bride
 2017 - Savanna Amour
 2016 - Secret Agenda
 2015 - Politeness
 2014 - Girl Guide
 2013 - Catkins
 2012 - Detours
 2011 - Sister Madly
 2010 - Valentine Miss
 2009 - Velocitea
 2008 - Vivacious Spirit
 2007 - Miss Judgement
 2006 - Queen Of The Hill
 2005 - †Sarah Michelle / Brindabella
 2004 - Strikeline
 2003 - Lovely Jubly
 2002 - Taimana
 2001 - Miss Power Bird 
 2000 - Piavonic 
 1999 - Snippets' Lass 

† Dead heat

See also
 List of Australian Group races
 Group races

References

 Australian Studbook - MRC How Now Stakes Race Winners

Horse races in Australia
Sprint category horse races for fillies and mares
Caulfield Racecourse